The following is a list of Tamil Hindu temples in Sri Lanka.

Central Province

Kandy District
 Sri Muthumari Amman Kovil, Mahaiyawa.Kandy.
 Kurinchi Kumaran Temple, Peradeniya
 Sri Devi Karumari Amman Temple, Nillambe, Peradeniya, Kandy
 Sri Muthumari Amman Temple, Galaha
 Sri Selva Vinayagar Temple, Kaddukala, Kandy
 Sri Kathirvelayuda Swami Kovil, Pussellawa
 Sri Selva Vinayagar Temple, Paradeka
 Sri Kathirvelayuda Swami Kovil, Gampola 
 Sri Muthumari Amman Devasthanam, Gampola

Matale District
 Sri Mariamman Temple, Warakamure
 Sri Muthumariamman Temple, Matale
 Sri Muthumariamman Temple, Maligatenna, Yatawatta
 Sri Selva Vinayagar Temple, Rattota
 Sri Sithy Vinayagar Temple, Matale
 Sri Sivasubramania Swami Temple, Ukuwela
 Sri Muthumaariamman Temple, Bambaragalla

Nuwara Eliya District
 Kethara Gowreeswarar Temple, Maskeliya
 Seetha Amman Temple, Nuwara Eliya
 Siva Temple, Kuliwata, Hatton
 Sri Lankatheeswarar Temple, Nuwara Eliya
 Sri Navanathar Siththar Sivan Temple, Kaddapula
 Sri Ayyappan Temple, Kandapola
Sri manilla pillayar kovil,Hatton
 Sri muththumariyamman kovil, Hatton
 Sri kathirvelayuthar swami kovil, Ragala

Eastern Province

Ampara District

 Chenaikudiruppu Sri Muthumariyamman Temple
 Meenaktchiyamman Temple, Senkatpaddai, Ninthavur
 Nageswarar Temple, Kamdickalai, Savalakkadai
 Paddinakar Kannaki Amman Alayam
 Palugamam Sivan Temple, Kalmunai
 Panankadu Pasupadeswarar Temple
 Pasupatheswarar Temple, Panankadu, Akkaraipattu
 Sivan Temple, Natpiddimuani, Kalmunai
 Sivan Temple, Vedduvaikkal, Karaitivu
 Sivan Temple, Vinayagapuram, Thirukkovil
 Sivapuram, Kalmunai
 Sri Ampalathady Temple, Kiddankyveethy, Natpiddimuani
 Sri Lingeswarar, Annamalai, Navithanveli
 Sri Naguleswarar Temple, Natpiddymunai, Kalmunai
 Sri Santhaneswarar Temple, Kalmunai
 Sri Vilavadi Vinayakar Alayam, Malwattai
 Thalaiyadi Sivan Temple, Thambiluvil
 Thambiluvil Kannaki Amman Temple, Thambiluvil
 Thambiluvil Sivan Temple, Thambiluvil
 Thambiluvil Sri Sivalinga Pillayar Temple, Thambiluvil
 Thirukkovil Sithira Velayutha Swami Temple, Thambiluvil
 Ukanthamalai Murugan Temple, Okanda
 Sri Siththi vinayagar temple (Central camp)

Batticaloa District

 Alakandy Pillai Sivan Temple, Valaichchenai
 Anaipanthy Sri Sithy Vigneswarar Thevalayam, Pulliyanthivu, Batticaloa
 Easwarar Temple, Kaluthawalai
 Kokkadicholai Thaanthonreeswarar Temple, Kokkadicholai
 Mamangeshvarar, Batticaloa
 Murugan Temple, Dandamalai
 Muttulingaswamy Temple, Dandamalai
 Sivan Temple, Cheddypalayam
 Sivan Temple, Kattankudy
 Sivan Temple, Kitulvewa, Chiththandy
 Sivan Temple, Navatkudah
 Sivan Temple, Pavatkodichchenai, Unnichchai
 Sivan Temple, Pethalai, Valaichchenai, Eravur
 Sivan Temple, Vivekananthapuram, Thiruppalukamam
 Sivaneswarar Temple, Selvanagar East
 Sivapuram Sivan Temple, Eruvil East
 Sri Kaneshvarar Temple, Valaichchenai
 Sri Lakshminaarayanar Temple, Arulnesapuram, Kadukkamunai, Kokkaddicholai
 Sri Pathirakali Amman Temple, Periya Urani, Batticaloa
 Sri Sithira Velayutha Swamy Koyil, Pulliyantivu, Batticaloa
 Sri Thackayageswarar Temple, Batticaloa
 Sri Thackayageswarar Temple, Manmunai
 Thanthonriswarar, Kokkatticholai
 Throupathayamman Temple, Pulliyantivu, Batticaloa
 Sri Siththi Vinayagar Temple, Puthunagar, Batticaloa

Trincomalee District

 Ati Konanayakar, Thampalakamam
 Athi Sivan Temple, Kanguvely, Muttur
 Choleeswaram Temple, Kantalai
 Kantalai Sivan Temple, Peraru
 Koneswaram Temple, Trincomalee
 Nadesar Temple, Sivayouga Puram
 Pathirakali Amman Temple, Trincomalee
 Senpeeswarar Temple, Sembimalai, Kuchchaveli
 Sivan Temple, Barathipuram, Kiliveddy, Muttur
 Sivan Temple, Gangai, Kinniya
 Sivan Temple, Lingapuram, Kiliveddy
 Sivan Temple, Mallikaithivu, Muttur
 Sri Visvanthaswamy Temple, Trincomalee
 Vellaivilpathira Koneswara Temple, Trincomalee

Northern Province

Jaffna District

 Aalamkanru Gnanavairavar Temple, Vetharadaippu, Karainagar, Kayts
 Aladai Vairavar Temple, Uyarapulam, Sandilipay
 Alady Sivan Temple, Puththur West
 Alady Vairavar Temple, Pungudutivu
 Alaveddy Datchinamoorthi Temple
 Alaveddy Pasupatheeswarar Temple
 Alaveddy Thiruvadineelal Temple
 Ambalavanar Temple, Karaikkal
 Ambalavaneswarar Temple, Pungadi, Ponnavodai, Ealalai West
 Anantha Nadarajah Temple, Mahajana College, Tellippalai
 Annamaheswarar Temple, Mylaney Noth, Chunnakam
 Anthikuli Gnanavairavar Temple, Savatkaddu, Sandilipay
 Arasady Pliar Temple, Sandilipay North, Sandilipay
 Arasady Vyravar Temple, Chankanai South, Valikamam West
 Ariyalai Neernochiyanthazhvu Sivan Temple
 Ariyalai Siddhivinayakar Temple (Sithivinayakar Temple), Ariyalai
 Arulmihu Gnanavairavar Temple, Kaithady West, Thenmarachchi
 Arulmihu Gnanavairavar Temple, Kokkuvil, Nallur
 Arulmihu Gnanavairavar Temple, Kondavil East, Nallur
 Arulmihu Gnanavairavar Temple, Kottawaththai, Karaveddy
 Arulmihu Manthikai Kanakai Amman Temple, Puloly South
 Arulmihu Paththanai Vairavar Temple, Alvai East, Karaveddy
 Arulmihu Sri Saamundaampikaa Sametha Eenchadi Gnanavairavar Temple, Suthumalai North, Manipay
 Athiparameswara Amman Temple, Kondavil
 Athi Vairavar Temple, Athikovilady, Point Pedro
 Athi Vairavar Temple, Pungudutivu
 Chandrasegaravaryvananathar Sivan Temple, Chavakachchery, Thenmarachchi
 Chempithodda Gna Vairavar Temple, Araly South, Valikamam West
 Easan Temple, Poyiddy, Achchelu
 Eradijar Pulam Vairavar Temple, Sandilipay North, Sandilipay
 Gnanavairavar Temple, Ariyalai, Nallur
 Gnanavairavar Temple, Chavakachcheri
 Gnanavairavar Temple, Chulipuram Center, Valikamam West
 Gnanavairavar Temple, Eachchamoddai, Jaffna
 Gnanavairavar Temple, Kodikamam, Thenmarachchi
 Gnanavairavar Temple, Konavalai, Point Pedro
 Gnanavairavar Temple, Mallakam, Tellippalai
 Gnanavairavar Temple, Naranthanai East, Kayts
 Gnanavairavar Temple, Nediyakadu, Point Pedro
 Gnanavairavar Temple, Pungudutivu
 Gnanavairavar Temple, Sirupiddy, Kopay
 Gnanavairavar Temple, Sithiyampuliyady, Tellippalai
 Gnanavairavar Temple, Tholpuram West, Valikamam West
 Gnanavairavar Temple, Valanthalai, Karainagar, Kayts
 Gnanavairavar Temple, Velanai, Islands South
 Idaikkadu Kasi Vishvanathar Temple
 Idippan Sivan Temple, Saravanai East, Velanai
 Ilupai Mulai Pillayaar Temple, Polikandy, Valvettithurai
 Imayanan North Sivan Gnana Vairavar Temple
 Innuvil Kandaswamy, Inuvil West, Inuvil
 Inuvil Sivan Temple
 Inuvil Sri Pararasa Segara Pillaiyar Temple, Inuvil West, Inuvil
 Iraddaipulam Gnanavairavar Temple, Sandilipay
 Irupalai Vaitheesvara Swamy Temple
 Jambunathar Sivan Temple, Pannipulam, Valikamam West
 Kaddy Sivan Temple, Karanavai East
 Kailasanathar Kailasapillaiyar Temple, Nallur
 Kalainagar Kampanpulo Athivairavar Temple, Sithankerny
 Kalaiyady Sivan Temple, Panippulam
 Kalavathurai Ganan Vyravar Temple, Araly South, Valikamam West
 Kanagambikasametha Kannikesara Temple, Vaddukoddai West
 Kanai Vairavar Temple, Kanai, Puloly
 Kandawsamy Temple, Neerverly North, Neervely
 Kannakai Amman Temple, Pungudutivu 
 Kanapatheeswaram Sivan Temple, Kayts
 Kandaswamy Vairavar Temple, Nunavil Centre, Chavakachcheri
 Kannalingeswarar Temple, Thirunelveli
 Kanthavanam Temple, Polikandy, Valvettithurai
 Karainagar Temple (Eelathu Chithambaram), Karaitivu
 Karukambai Easwaran Temple, Puththur East
 Kasikandam Sivan Temple, Navaly, Manipay
 Kasi Viswanathar Temple, Keerimalai, Thellipalai
 Kasi Viswanathar Temple, Thellipalai
 Kilisiddy Gnanavairavar Temple, Irumbu Mathavady, Vathiry, Karaveddy
 Kiranjiyampathi Minakshi Sundareshwarar Temple, Perungadu, Pungudutivu
 Kirubhakhara Sivasubramaniya Temple (Puthuk Temple), Kokuvil East
 Koddadiperan Sivan Temple, Chulipuram West, Valikamam West
 Koilamanai Maruthady Sivan Temple, Koyilamanai, Kodikamam, Thenmarachchi
 Konamalai Vairavar Temple, Kokuvil East, Nallur
 Koneswarar Temple, Thondamanaru, Point Pedro
 Koonan Paruththy Vairavar Temple, Ilakady, Karainagar, Kayts
 Kottu Vassal Amman Temple (Sandika Parameswari Amman Temple), Point Pedro
 Kovitkadavai, Thunnalai
 Koyvalai Nadarajah Ramalingha Swamy Temple, Aavarangal
 Kulathady Vairavar Temple, Polikandy West, Point Pedro
 Kunthady Sivan Temple, Vadaliyadaippu
 Kurunthady Vairavar Temple, Pungudutivu
 Kumarakoddam Gnanavairavar Temple, Kondavil, Nallur
 Lanka Paruthi Vyravar Temple, Chankanai Center
 Lingeswarar Temple, Keerimalai, Tellippalai
 Maijer Kotti Vairavar Temple, Sandilipay North, Sandilipay
 Mangalambika Sametha Mangaleswarar Temple, Vaddukoddai West
 Manthiddy Vairavar Temple, Valalai, Achchuveli
 Maruthady Gnanavairavar Temple, Point Pedro
 Maruthady Thanthonreeswarar Temple, Vadamaratchi
 Maruthady Vairavar Temple, Pungudutivu
 Masivan Meenadsiyamman Temple, Neervely West
 Mavady Ganavairavar Temple, Chankanai South, Valikamam West
 Mavady Vaitheeswara Temple, Valvetty Centre
 Meesalai Panrikkeni Kandasamy Kovil 
 Maviddapuram Kandaswamy Temple, Maviddapuram
 Mayiliyar Vairavar Temple, Idaikurichchy, Varany, Thenmarachchi
 Moochampilavu Sivan Temple, Vallipuram, Puloly
 Muruka Moorthi Temple, Alangkulai, Sandilipay North, Sandilipay
 Muthaliyam Temple, Palaly East, Palaly
 Muththuchamiar Sivan Temple, Nainativu
 Nadarajapperumal Temple, Velanai West
 Nadarasar Temple, Palaly South, Vasavilan
 Nagathambirann Alayam, Valalai West, Achchuveli
 Nagendra Madam Sivan Temple, Arali North
 Naguleswaram Temple, Keerimalai
 Nainativu Nagapooshani Amman Temple, Nainativu
 Nallur Kandaswamy temple, Nallur
 Nallur Sivan Temple
 Nanthavil Amman Temple kokuvil
 Narasingha Vairavar Temple, Shanthypuram, Madduvil North, Thenmarachchi
 Nayinai Nakapoosani Amman Temple, Nayinathivu
 Nedunkulam Gnanavairavar Temple, Delft
 Neelathakshi Samedha Sri Kayagaroneshwarar Temple, Thirunelveli
 Neeraviyadi Sri Natesar Temple
 Nikara Gnanavyravar Temple, Chankanai West, Valikamam West
 Nunasai Sivan Temple, Madakal, Sandilipay
 Nunasai Vishalakshi Vishvanatheswarar Temple, Madakal, Sandilipay
 Odakarai Sivan Temple, Chanknai South, Valikamam West
 Ollai Vembady Gnanavairavar Temple, Neervely, Kopay
 Olludai Gnavairavar Temple, Kadivalai Elavalai, Tellippalai
 Om Sri Palayadipillayar Temple, Meesalai
 Paddaiyolachchy Veerapaththeerar Temple, Meesalai East, Thenmarachchi
 Palaivairavar, Pungudutivu
 Palaly Raja Rajeswari Amman Temple, Palaly East, Palaly
 Palaly Paththira kali kovil, Palaly Esat , Palaly
 Paralai Eeswara Vinayagar Temple, Chulipuram East
 Paramasivan Temple, Ketpeli West, Mirusuvil, Thenmarachchi
 Parameswaran Kovil, University of Jaffna, Kokuvil
 Pasupatheeswarar Alayam, Paruthithurai, Puloly, Point Pedro
 Periya Thambiran Temple, Idaikkadu, Achchuveli
 Periya Thambiran Temple, palaly East, Palaly
 Perunthalai Sivan Temple, Sirupiddy West, Neervely, Kopay
 Ponnampalavaneswarar Temple, Koddai
 Puloly Pasupatheeswarar Temple
 Puthaiyadi Vairavar Temple, Pungudutivu
 Puttalai Pillayar Temple, Puttalai
 Raja Rajeswary Amman Temple, Palaly east, Palaly
 Ramalingeshwarar, Panavidai, Urathivu, Pungudutivu
 Saaththiriyar Madam Anjaneyar Temple, Sangarathai
 Saaththiriyar Madam Murugan Temple, Sangarathai
 Sadaiyaly Gnanavairavar Temple, Sadaiyaly, Karainagar, Kayts
 Sadaiyandy Vairavar Temple, Valvai South West, Point Pedro
 Sakkalawathay Gnanavairavar Temple, Karaveddy
 Saddanathar Temple, Nallur
 Sampunathar Sivan Temple, Pannipulam, Valikamam West
 Samundathevi Sametha Gnanavairavar Temple, Kondavil, Nallur
 Sandirasekara Veerapathira Swamy Temple, Udupiddy South
 Sangarathai Pittiyam Pathy Pathirakali Temple
Sangaththanai Meenakshi Amman temple chavakachcheri
 Sanguvelly Sivagnana Pillaiyar Temple
 Sanguvelly Vettukkattai Pillaiyar Temple
 Sankili Vairavar Temple, Barathi Veethy, Achchuveli, Point Pedro
 Sankili Vairavar Temple, Paththaimeni, Achchuveli, Kopay
 Santanamutalichipuram Srinadarasamoorthy Temple, Kudiyiruppu
 Sattanathar Temple, Rajathani, Nallur
 Sekarasa sekarappillaiyar Temple, Inuvil West, Inuvil
 Selva Sannithi Temple, Thondamararu
 Sinnavalavu Gnavairavar Temple, Araly North, Valikamam West
 Sithamparam Ambalavanr Temple, Chankanai Center, Valikamam West
 Sivagnavairavar Temple, Kailaya Valavu, Mallakam, Tellippalai
 Sivan Temple, Aavarangal, Valvettithurai
 Sivan Temple, Alady, Chunnakam, Uduvil
 Sivan Temple, Allolai
 Sivan Temple, Arali South
 Sivan Temple, Colombuthurai, Jaffna
 Sivan Temple, Columbuthurai West, Jaffna
 Sivan Temple, Kadduvan Kulam, Saravanai
 Sivan Temple, Kaladdy, Valvettithurai
 Sivan Temple (Eelaththu Sithamparam), Karainagar, Kayts
 Sivan Temple, Kayts
 Sivan Temple, Kopay South
 Sivan Temple, Kovitpulam, Tellippalai
 Sivan Temple, Mahiyapiddy
 Sivan Temple, Mudamavady Santhi
 Sivan Temple, Mullanai, Ilavalai
 Sivan Temple, Muchampulavu, Puloly South, Point Pedro
 Sivan Temple, Poovatkarai, Puloly, Point Pedro
 Sivan Temple, 3rd Ward, Pungudutivu
 Sivan Temple, 7th Ward, Pungudutivu
 Sivan Temple, Pungudutivu
 Sivan Temple, Punnalaikadduwan South, Uduvil
 Sivan Temple (Nadarasar Ramalingasamy Temple), Puththur West
 Sivan Temple (Vishalakshi Vishvanathar Temple), Sudumalai North, Sandilipay
 Sivan Temple, Theivendram, Sithankeny
 Sivan and Vairavar Temple, Alaveddy South
 Sivapootharatheswarar Temple, Udumpirai East
 Sivasubramaniyar Temple, Nallur
 Sri Aathy Vairavar Temple, Kayts
 Sri Ampalavanr Temple, Nedunkulam, Jaffna
 Sri Gnavairavar Temple, Sangaththanai, Islands South
 Sri Gnanavairavar Perumal Temple, Thirunelveli North, Nallur
 Sri Gnaneswarar Temple, Kondavil East, Nallur
 Sri Gana Vyravar Temple, Nainativu
 Sri Kailasanathar Temple, Nallur
 Sri Kamalambikaisametha Kailasasamy Temple, Nallur
 Sri Kathiramalai Sivan Temple, Chunnakam
 Sri Mahaa Ganapathi Pillaiyaar Temple, Sithankerney, Valikamam West
 Sri Meenadchi Somasundareswaraswamy Temple (Amman Temple), Uduvil
 Sri Muthu Vinayagar Temple, Ariyalai
 Sri Nagawaratha Naaraayanar Thevasthanam, Alaveddy
 Sri Nageswaran Temple, Puliyantivu, Analaitivu
 Sri Pathirakali Amman/Ambaal Temple, Polikandy, VVT
 Sri Potpathi Vinayakar Temple, Kokuvil East
 Sri Puveneswarar Ambal Temple, Kondavil, Nallur
 Sri Shankaranathar Murugamoorthy Temple, Analaitivu
 Sri Sithambareswara Sivakamyambal Devas, Karainagar Center, Kayts
 Sri Siva Sithamparaeswarar Temple, Sithankerny, Valikamam West
 Sri Vallipura Aalwar Temple, Vallipuram, Puloly 
 Sri Veerapaththira Temple, Velanai, Islands South
 Sri Visalachchi Samatha Visvanathar Temple, Araly Centre, Valikamam West
 Sri Vishvanatha Swamy Temple (Sivan Temple), Myalaney, Chunnakam
 Sri Visvalinga Maha Kanapathy Temple, Vannarpannai North West
 Sri Visvareswaraswamy Temple, Karaikkal, Inuvil East, Kondavil
 Suthumalai Puvaneswary Amman Temple (Suthumalai)  
 Suthumalai Murugan Temple (Suthumalai)
 Thantrontreeswarar Amman Temple, Alaveddy West
 Thanthontry Gnavairavar Temple, Kaithady, Navatkuly South, Thenmarachchi
 Thanthontry Manonmani Amman Temple, Naranthanai North, Kayts
 Thillai Sivan Temple, Mandaitivu
 Thoddaththu Vairavar Temple, Puloly
 Thuratti Panai MuththuMari Amman Temple, Vaddukoddai East
 Thuvali Kannakai Amman Temple, Uduppiddy
 Ubayakathirgamam, Upayakathirkamam, Puloly
 Urumpirai Chokkanathar Temple
 Vaddukoddai Sivan Temple (Visaladchi Visvesar, Verrapathirar)
 Vaduvavaththai Veerapathrar Temple, Vaduvavaththai, Puloly
 Vairavar Temple, Kaithady Center, Kumaranagar, Thenmarachchi
 Vairavar Temple, Karamban, Kayts
 Vairavar Temple, Kulathady, Jaffna
 Vairavar Temple, Madduvil South, Thenmarachchi
 Vairavar Temple, Manthuvil West, Kodikamam, Thenmarachchi
 Vairavar Temple, Netkolu, Thondamanaru, Point Pedro
 Vairavar Temple, Revady, Point Pedro
 Vairavar Temple, Sithambaramoorthikerny, Kayts
 Vairavar Temple, Saravanai West, Velanai, Islands South
 Vairavar Temple, VVT, Point Pedro
 Vairavar Muniyappar Temple, Kaithady Center, Kumaranagar, Thenmarachchi
 Valalai East Kali Temple, Valalai, Atchuvely
 Valalai Neerppeddy Murugan Temple, Valalai, Atchuvely
 Valalai Pillayar Temple, Valalai, Atchuvely
 Valambikai Sametha Vaitheeswara Temple, Karaveddy
 Valambikai Sametha Vaitheeswara Temple, Valvai South West, Point Pedro
 Vallai Vaitheeswaran Temple, Vallai South West, Valvettithurai
 Valliappar Gnanavairavar Temple, Karaveddy
 Vallipuranathar Temple, Kondavil Center
 Vaaykkaal Taravai Pillaiyaar Temple, Neerverly North, Neervely
 Vannai Sri Kamakshi Amman Kovil (Nachchimar Temple), Vannarpannai, Jaffna
 Vannai Sri Vengadesa Varatharaja Perumal Temple, Jaffna
 Vannai Sri Veermakali Amman Temple, Jaffna
 Vannarpannai Vaitheeswaran Temple, Vannarpannai
 Veeramalai Vairavar Temple, Pungudutivu
 Veerapathirar Temple, Katkovalam, Point Pedro
 Veerapathirar Temple, Ketpeli Centre, Mirusuvil, Thenmarachchi
 Veerapathirar Temple, Maravanpulo North, Thenmarachchi
 Veerapathirar Temple, Palavy South, Kodikamam, Thenmarachchi
 Veerapathirar Temple, Pungudutivu
 Velakkai Pillaiyar Temple, Manipay
 Visaladchi Ambika Sametha Vishvanathaswamy Temple, Vattakkaipathy, Kantharodai
 Vishalkshi Vishwanathar Temple, Puthur, Valvedditturai
 Visvanatha Sivan Temple, Mylani, Chunnakam
 Villoonri Veeragathi Vinayagar Temple, Jaffna
Sangaththani Vairavaswmi Kanthaswami Kovil 
(Kuddi Nallur)

Kilinochchi District
 Addathuddivairavar Temple, Gnanimadam, Poonakari
 Aknivairavar Temple, Gnanimadam, Poonakari
 Alady Vinayakar Alayam, Ramanathapuram Center, Kilinochchi
 Arasarkerny Sivan Temple, Pallai
 Athmalingeswarar Alayam, Ramanathapuram, Kilinochchi
 Aththikandu Vairavar Temple, Arasar Kerny, Pallai
 Kallady Vairavar Temple, Pallai
 Kampilivairavar Temple, Gnanimadam, Poonakari
 Kanakampikai Ampal Great Temple, Iranaimadu, Kilinochchi
 Karanthai Vairavar Temple, Tharmakerny, Pallai
 Maruthady Vairavar Temple, Gnanimadam, Poonakari
 Mudavairavar Temple, Pallikkudha, Poonakari
 Monduvan Vairavar Temple, Arasar Kerny, Pallai
 Nainakaddu Vairavar Temple, Veddukkadu, Poonakari
 Narasimmavairavar Temple, Pallai Nagar, Pallai
 Pampadiththan Vairavar Temple, Sempankunru, Poonakari
 Paddivairavar Temple, Gowtharimuani, Poonakari
 Sivan Temple, Allippalai, Pallai
 Sivan Temple, Kanakambikai Kulam, Karachchi
 Sivan Temple, Krishnapuram, Karachchi
 Sivan Temple, Mayavanoor, Karachchi
 Sivan Temple, Uthayanagar West, Karachchi
 Sudalai Vairavar Temple, Puthumurippu, Karachchi
 Uruthirapureeswaram Sivan Temple
 Vaikalady Vairavar Temple, Karrukkaithivu, Poonakari
 Vairavar Temple, Akkarayan, Karachchi
 Vairavar Temple, Cheddiyakuruchchi, Poonakari
 Vairavar Temple (Kannakai Ambal Temple), Kaneshapuram, Kilinochchi
 Vairavar Temple, Kavakulam, Poonakari
 Vairavar Temple, Madduvilnadu West, Poonakari
 Vairavar Temple, Samippulam, Poonakari
 Vairavar Temple, Selvapuram, Poonakari
 Vairavar Temple, Sithankuruchchi, Poonakar
 Vairavar Temple, Thirunagar, Karachchi
 Vairavar Temple, Thirunagar North, Karachchi
 Vayalur Murugan Temple, Kilinochchi
 Veerapathirar Temple, Karikkoddukkulam, Poonakari
 Veerapathirar Temple, Mannaiththalai, Poonakari
 Vilathikadu Vairavar Temple, Nallur, Poonakari
 Vinayahapuram Pillayar Temple, Kilinochchi

Mannar District
 Ellapparmaruthankulam Vinayagar Temple
 Ketheeswaram Temple, Mathottam
 Shiva Temple, Iranai Illuppaikkulam
 Sivan Temple, Savatkaddu
 Sri Muthumariyamman Temple, Talaimannar

Mullaitivu District

 Amman Temple, Thunukkai
 Athivairavar Temple, Kallappadu, Mullaitivu
 Athivairavar Temple, Karippaddamurippu, Oddusuddan
 Gnanavairavar Temple, Karippaddamurippu, Oddusuddan
 Gnanavairavar Temple, Mullaitivu, Maritimepattu
 Iyanar Temple, Uyilankulam, Thunukkai
 Karpaka Venayakar, Uyilankulam, Thunukkai
 Murugan Temple, Viji Ved Kallappadu, Mullaitivu
 Narasimmar Temple, Uyilankulam, Thunukkai
 Pathalavairavar Temple, Olumadu, Mankulam, Oddusuddan
 Puthukkula Venayakar, Puthukkulam, Thunukkai
 Sannarsi Temple Uyilankulam, Thunukkai
 Selva Venayakar, Veddajadappu, Thunukkai
 Sivan Temple, Inthupuram, Thirumurukandy
 Sivan Temple, Koddaikaddiyakulam, Thunukkai
 Sivan Temple, Manthuvil, Puthukudiyiruppu
 Sivan Temple, Puthukudiyiruppu
 Soolavairavar Temple, Olumadu, Mankulam, Oddusuddan
 Thanthondreeswarar Temple, Mullaitivu
 Thantrontreeswarar Temple, Oddusuddan
 Thiththakarai Amman Temple Kallappadu
 Vairavar Temple, Katkidangu, Mankulam, Oddusuddan
 Vairavar Temple, Mankulam Veethy, Oddusuddan
 Vairavar Temple, Sammalan Kulam, Oddusuddan
 Veravaththerer Temple Uyilankulam, Thunukkai

Vavuniya District
 Gnavairavar Temple, Vavuniya, Rambaikulam
 Kanagarayankulam Ithiyadi Siththivinayagar Temple, Kanagarayankulam, Vavuniya
 Kovilkulam Sivan Temple, Vavuniya
 Sannasi Vairavar Temple, Kaththar Sinnakkulam, Vavuniya
 Sasthirikulam Sivan Temple, Vavuniya
 Sivan Temple, Thonickkal
 Sri Muththumari Amman Temple, Thonikkal, Vavuniya
 Sri Pulijadi Sithivenajakar Temple, Rambaikulam, Vavuniya
 Sri Thurkkai Amman Temple, Srinagar, Poonthoddam, Vavuniya.
 Vairavar Temple, Kurumankadhu, Vavuniya
 Vairavar Temple, Veethy, Vavuniya
 Veerapaththirar Temple, Sasthirykoolankulam, Vavuniya
Pandarikulam Sri Muththumari Amman Kovil

North Central Province

Polannaruwa District
 Chola period Sivan Temple (Shiva Devalaya), Polannaruwa

North Western Province

Kurunegala District
 Sri Muththumari Amman Temple, Mawattegama
 Sri Muththumari Amman Temple, Thelvidda
 Sri Selva Vinayagar Temple, Kurunegala
 Sri Sivasubramanir Temple (Kuliapitty Temple), Pallapitty

Puttalam District
 Munneswaram temple, Munneswaram
 Sivan Temple, Maanavari, Rajakathaluwai
 sri thirowpathai amman kovil, kudiyiruppu, mundel
 sri raakkurushi amman kovil, kudiyiruppu, mundel
 Sri rukmani saththiyapaamaa sametha sri paarththa saarathi Sri thirowpathaiamman thevashthaanam, Udappu 
 Sri veerapathra kaliyamman Kovil, Udappu
 Sri Muththumariyamman kovil, Udappu
 Sri Aadhi Naagathampiraan temple, Selvapuram, Udappu

Sabaragamuwa Province

Kegalle District
 Sri Kalpandara Temple, Ambanpattiya, Kegalle
 Sri Kathirvelautha Swamy Temple, Kegalle
 Sri Kathirvelautha Swamy Temple, Parakkaduvai
 Sri Mahavishnu Temple, Parakkaduvai
 Sri Muththumariyamman Temple, Puwakpitya

Ratnapura District
 Lord Shiva Feet Temple, Adam's Peak
 Sri Kanageswara Temple, Gangoda, Rakwana
 Srimath Thiripurasundari Ambiga Sameda Ratnasabesar, Ratnapura
 Sri Muththumariyamman Temple, Rakwana

Southern Province

Galle District
 Galle Sivan Temple (Sri Meenadchi Antheswarar Temple), Galle
 Sri Kathirvelayutha Swami Temple (Kathiresan Temple), Kaluwella, Galle
 Sri Muthumari Amman Temple, Alpitiya
 Sri Muthumari Amman Temple, Nakiyadeniya, Galle
 Tondeshwaram, Devinuwara

Hambantota District
 Sri Kathiresan Temple, Hambantota

Matara District
 Sithi Vinayagar Temple, Deniyaya
 Sri Mahapathirakali Temple, Veharahena, Matara
 Sri Muthumari Amman Temple, Deniyaya
 Sri Muthumari Amman Temple, Pidapethara
 Tenavaram temple, Dondra Head

Uva Province

Badulla District
 Hindu Temple, Ledchawattai Thoddam, Viyaluwa
 Sri Sivasubramaniyar Swamy Alayam, Uva Kettawela, Hali Ela

Monaragala District
 Kathirkamam temple, Kataragama

Western Province

Colombo District
 Panchikawatta Sri Karumaari Amman Temple 
 Aishwaraya Lakshmi Amman Temple, Wellawatte
 Arulmihu Nagapoosani, Colombo
 Kadhirkama Velan, Mount Lavinia
 Kathiresan Temple, Colombo
 Maha Kali Amman Temple, Mutwal
 Modara Sivan Temple, Colombo
 Pazaiya Kadhir Velayudha Swamy Temple, Colombo
 Ponnambaleshvarar, Shivakamasundhari, Colombo
 Bhama Rukmani Sameda Sri Partha Sarathi Permal Temple [Sri Krishnan Temple], Colombo
 Puthiya Kadhir Velayudha Swamy Temple, Colombo
 Sivan Temple, Ratmalana
 Sri Anjaneyar Kovil, Mount Lavinia
 Sri Aatheparaasakthi Temple, Colombo
 Sri Durka Temple, Colombo
 Sri Iyswariya Luxmi Temple, Colombo
 Sri Kailasanatha Swamy Temple, Colombo
 Sri Karumari Amman Temple, Kolonnawa
 Sri Koneshwari Maha Davi Temple, Colombo
 Sri Munneswarar Temple, Sri Bodhiraja Mattta, Colombo
 Sri Munneswarar Swamy Temple, Bandaranayake Mawatha, Colombo
 Sri Muthumari Amman Temple, Puwakpitiya
 Sri Papathi Amman Temple, Colombo
 Sri Ponnambalavaneswarar Temple, Colombo
 Sri Sivalingaperuman and Sri Kathirgma Temple, Ratmalana
 Sri Visnu Temple, Colombo
 Subramaniya Swamy Temple, Colombo
 Ubaya Kadhirkamam, Pambalapitti, Colombo
 Ubaya Kadhirkamam, Vellavaththai, Colombo
 Vinayakar Temple, Colombo

Gampaha District
 Muththumari Amman Temple, Negombo
 Sri Muthu Kumaran Temple, Hunipitiya, Wattala
 Sri Poopala Vinayagar Temple, Peliyagoda
 Sri Somasundareswar Swamy Temple, Paliyagoda
 Sri Sithi Vinayagar Temple, Negombo
 Sri Siva Subramaniya Swami Temple, Wattala

Kalutara District
 Amman Temple, Maahama
 Kathirvelautha Swami Temple, Kalutara
 Sri Kanthaswami Temple, Panadura
 Sri Muthumari Amman Temple, Ingiriya
 Sri Muthumari Amman Temple, Pathurelia, Kalutara
 Sri Muthumari Amman Temple [Eladuwa]

See also
 List of Hindu temples

References

External links

 
Sri Lanka
Hindu temples